Bror Erik Friberg (6 July 1839 – 3 February 1878) was a New Zealand immigration agent. He was born in Kristianstad, Sweden on 6 July 1839. He died on 3 February 1878 at Norsewood, New Zealand.

References

1839 births
1878 deaths
Swedish emigrants to New Zealand
People from Kristianstad Municipality
New Zealand justices of the peace